Otherness is the fifth studio album by Canadian post-hardcore band Alexisonfire. The album was released on June 24, 2022, thirteen years after the release of their last full-length album, Old Crows / Young Cardinals. It is also their first album since reuniting in 2015. The album takes its name from the first single from the album released, "Sweet Dreams of Otherness", which premiered on YouTube on March 10, 2022. It peaked at No. 4 on the Canadian albums chart.

The album won the Juno Award for Rock Album of the Year at the Juno Awards of 2023.

Background
Alexisonfire reunited in 2015 but did not release any new material until February 15, 2019, when they released "Familiar Drugs", their first song in over eight years. On May 24, 2019, the band released another standalone single called "Complicit", followed by "Season of the Flood", on January 13, 2020.

There appeared to be little intention from the band to release another full-length album until January 18, 2022, when it was reported that the band's Genius page had been updated, showing metadata about an unreleased Alexisonfire album, complete with artwork and tracklist.

Track listing

Personnel
Alexisonfire
 George Pettit – vocals
 Dallas Green – vocals, guitars
 Wade MacNeil –  guitars, vocals
 Chris Steele – bass
 Jordan Hastings – drums, percussion
 Darren Magierowski - recording  engineer 
 Jill Zimmermann - recording engineer
 Jonah Falco - mixing engineer

Charts

References

2022 albums
Alexisonfire albums
Dine Alone Records albums
Juno Award for Rock Album of the Year albums